The Krauser Domani is a motorcycle based, 3-wheeled vehicle developed by Michael Krauser and powered by BMW, built for sale in Japan and Europe. The vehicle looks like a motorcycle with a sidecar attached, however unlike the former, the "sidecar" of the Domani is structurally an integral part of the frame. In Japan, a motorcycle license is not required to drive it, a normal car license is sufficient.

Body & Chassis

The Domani is built around a torsionally rigid tubular steel frame with structurally integrated sidecar unit. As mentioned above, the sidecar portion of the vehicle is an integral part of the frame. One of the advantages of this is that the frame is torsionally stiffer than that of a regular sidecar equipped motorcycle. Also, the suspension and layout for the two rear wheels can now be more car-like, with the sidecar's wheel being driven as well, making the vehicle a true rear-wheel drive. The unique frame also allows for aerodynamic fibreglass bodywork that wouldn't be possible in a traditional set-up. This in turn allows for some unique packaging of the components, for example the radiator is mounted in the sidecar where it's better exposed to airflow. The aerodynamic skin also allows for the inclusion of a small luggage compartment in the back.

Engine
The Domani is powered by a BMW K 1200 engine producing 150 hp and connected to a 5-speed gearbox. The engine, coupled with the Domani's light curb weight (390 kg) is enough to power the vehicle to a factory specified maximum of over 200 km/h.

Suspension
The Domani utilizes 3 wheel independent suspension with double-wishbones at the rear and dual rocker arms at the front. These are connected to  185/60 - R14 tyres at the front and in the sidecar and 195/60 - R15 tyred at the rear.

See also
List of motorized trikes
GG Duetto
BMW K1200R
BMW K1200RS
BMW K1200GT

External links

Tricycle motorcycles